József Romhányi (8 March 1921 – 7 May 1983) was a Hungarian writer, poet, translator, and artist.

Originally he wanted to be a musician and learned viola in the Székesfővárosi Felsőbb Zenei Iskola musical school. From 1951 he worked as a playreader on Hungarian Radio, and in 1957 he became the director of the art department of the Hungarian State Concert and Programme Directorate. Between 1960 and 1962 he was the director of the popular art section of Hungarian Television. From 1962 he was a playreader in the Main Musical Department of Hungarian Radio.

He wrote several librettos for Hungarian operas, including Hunyady for Rezső Sugár (1953), Báthory Zsigmond for Horusitzky Zoltán (1960), and Muzsikus Péter for György Ránki (1963).

He translated several operas and musicals into Hungarian; the best known is Cats.

He wrote scripts for the cartoons Lúdas Matyi and Hófehér.

He is known for his animal poems that were released after his death with the title Szamárfül ("Earmark" and "Ear of a Donkey").

He is perhaps best known for the scripts of various Hungarian cartoon series, including Mézga Család (The Gums), the Kérem a következőt! ("Next, please!" or "Dr. Bubo", 1973–74) and some translations for dubbed versions of American cartoons, like the rhyming translation of The Flintstones and of Huckleberry Hound. He was nicknamed "Romhányi, a rímhányó", a rhyme meaning "Romhanyi the Rhyme-Thrower".

Sources 
 Reményi Gyenes István: Ismerjük őket? Zsidó származású nevezetes magyarok arcképcsarnoka, Budapest, Ex Libris kiadó, 2000., 
 [ Magyar életrajzi lexikon]
 TheatreDB page, szinhaziadattar.hu
 Kemény Egon

External links 

 Hunagrian Dubbing Database 
 Online poems
 Szamárfül 
 Author page on Moly.hu
 Wikiquotes

1921 births
1983 deaths
Hungarian translators
Hungarian poets
Hungarian librettists
Hungarian television writers
Male television writers
Writers from Budapest
20th-century translators
20th-century Hungarian screenwriters